Crawford College, Sandton is a South African alternative, independent school in Benmore, Sandton (Johannesburg), Gauteng. It is the Sandton Campus of the Crawford Schools. This School was originally a farm before becoming a school.

External links
Crawford College, Sandton

Private schools in Gauteng
Schools in Johannesburg
Educational institutions established in 1993
1993 establishments in South Africa